Bohdan Szyszkowski (born June 20, 1873, in Trybuchy, Podolia, Russia (now village in Ukraine) – August 13, 1931 in Myślenice, Poland) was a Polish chemist and member of PAU.

Szyszkowski published important papers on electrochemistry and surface chemistry.

See also
 Szyszkowski equation

References 

1873 births
1931 deaths
Polish chemists